Aleksandar Simić may refer to:

 Aleksandar Simić (composer) (born 1973), Serbian composer
 Aleksandar Simić (footballer) (born 1980), Serbian footballer
 Aleksandar Simić (Chetnik), Serbian guerrilla fighter